Albert Reeves Law (24 December 1929 – 17 May 1970) was an Australian rules footballer who played for the Essendon Football Club in the Victorian Football League (VFL). 

Law won a VFL reserves premiership for Essendon in 1952  before returning to his old side Moe in the Latrobe Valley Football League. 

He later coached Moe's reserves and then seniors, leading the team to a senior premiership in 1967. 

He was employed by the State Electricity Commission of Victoria.

Notes

External links 
		

Essendon Football Club past player profile
1967 LaTrobe Valley FL Premiers: Moe FC

1929 births
1970 deaths
Australian rules footballers from Victoria (Australia)
Essendon Football Club players
Moe Football Club players